The Leonardo Permanent Multipurpose Module (PMM) is a module of the International Space Station. It was flown into space aboard the Space Shuttle Discovery on STS-133 on 24 February 2011 and installed on 1 March. Leonardo is primarily used for storage of spares, supplies and waste on the ISS, which was until then stored in many different places within the space station. It is also the personal hygiene area for the astronauts who live in the US Orbital Segment. The Leonardo PMM was a Multi-Purpose Logistics Module (MPLM) before 2011, then was modified into its current configuration. It was formerly one of two MPLM used for bringing cargo to and from the ISS with the Space Shuttle. The module was named for Italian polymath Leonardo da Vinci.

Like the other Multi-Purpose Logistics Modules, it was constructed by the Italian Space Agency, who chose to name it after Leonardo da Vinci. Construction began in April 1996, and the module was delivered to NASA at the Kennedy Space Center in August 1998 by an Airbus Beluga aircraft.

Previous proposals
A European proposal suggested equipping the Donatello MPLM with enhanced micrometeoroid/orbital debris protection and cooling systems, and leaving it attached to the ISS after the Space Shuttle fleet was retired. Costs for such MPLM modifications were estimated at $20M to $40M per unit. The MPLM would then be called a Permanent Multipurpose Module (PMM), and it would house spare parts and supplies, allowing longer times between resupply missions. The proposal was rejected by NASA because it would require changes to existing plans and would entail additional costs. Internal discussions continued and managers considered the possibility of STS-133, which at that time was planned to be the last Shuttle flight, leaving its MPLM permanently attached. The United Launch Alliance also published a proposal for a system that could allow additional ISS modules to be launched on an EELV even after the retirement of the Shuttle.

On August 5, 2009 it was announced that STS-133 would indeed leave one MPLM permanently attached to the station. In October 2009, it was confirmed that Leonardo would be the MPLM converted to a PMM. It was launched on February 24, 2011. The PMM was transferred to the station using the Shuttle robotic arm and mated to the nadir (Earth) facing port of Unity.

On May 27, 2015, at 13:08 UTC, the PMM was relocated from the nadir port of the Unity module to the forward-facing port of the Tranquility module. This was done in order to allow Unity's nadir port to serve as a berthing port for resupply craft, which in turn frees up Harmonys zenith port for future U.S. Commercial Crew Development spacecraft.

After the re-location of Leonardo from the Unity module to the Tranquility module (which is where the toilet is located) in addition to its function as a storage module it is now the personal hygiene area for the ISS astronauts in the US Orbital Segment. Astronauts have much privacy in Leonardo and do sponge baths and change their clothes here.

Leonardo might also be used on Axiom Station after the ISS is decommissioned.

Modifications

After returning to Earth on April 20, 2010 at the end of the STS-131 mission, the Leonardo MPLM was moved to the  Space Station Processing Facility (SSPF) at the Kennedy Space Center in Florida to undergo modifications. To convert the Leonardo MPLM into the PMM, NASA made the following modifications: removal of +Y grapple fixture (Flight Releasable Grapple Fixture, or FRGF), removal of ROFU (Remotely Operated Fluid Umbilical) components, replacement of CBM seal, installation of new forward end cone MMOD shields, feed through seal replacement, and installation of visiting vehicle retro-reflectors.

In addition, the Multi-layer insulation (MLI)  blankets from the never-flown Donatello MPLM were cannibalized for use on Leonardo. The blankets were removed and returned to Italy where they were reinforced with Nextel/Kevlar to provide better protection against micro-meteorites. The upgraded blankets were then installed on about two-thirds of Leonardos surface area.

As an MPLM

The Leonardo MPLM, also known as MPLM-1, was one of three Multi-Purpose Logistics Modules which were operated by NASA to transfer supplies and equipment to and from the International Space Station. Leonardo was used for eight of the twelve MPLM flights to the space station, with Raffaello being used for the other four. It was the first MPLM to be launched, making its first flight in March 2001, aboard  on STS-102.

Flights

See also

 Bigelow Expandable Activity Module (smaller than Leonardo)
 List of International Space Station spacewalks
 List of spacewalks 2000–2014

References

External links
 Thales Alenia Space's PMM page
 NASA's Space Shuttle page

Components of the International Space Station
Spacecraft launched in 2011
MPLM-1